The N (Northern) postcode area, also known as the London N postcode area, is the part of the London post town covering part of North London, England. It is a group of 25 postcode districts which covers around 17,429 live postcodes.

The area covers parts of the London Boroughs of Hackney, Islington, Camden, Barnet, Haringey and Enfield.

Postal administration
The postcode area originated in 1857 as the N district of London. In 1917 it was subdivided into 22 numbered districts. The Northern head district was designated as N1 and the rest of the numbering followed the alphabetical order of the other districts' main names. Most districts include local areas known by their own specific names (see table below). The official post town for all N postcodes is LONDON; district names do not form an essential part of postal addresses.

In 2010, a new N1C district was formed out of the far western part of the original N1 district, to accommodate redevelopment in Kings Cross Central. The N area also includes two non-geographic postcode districts: N1P for PO boxes in N1 or N1C; and N81 for ballot mailings to Electoral Reform Services in N8.

List of postcode districts
The approximate coverage of the postcode districts, with the historic postal district names shown in italics:

 
|-
! N1
| LONDON
| Northern head district: Barnsbury (part), Canonbury, Kings Cross, Islington, Pentonville, De Beauvoir Town, Hoxton. Shoreditch (part)
| Hackney, Islington, Camden
|-
! N1C
| LONDON
| Kings Cross Central
| Camden
|-
! N1P
| LONDON
| PO boxes in N1 and N1C
| non-geographic
|-
! N2
| LONDON
| East Finchley district: East Finchley, Fortis Green, Hampstead Garden Suburb (part)
| Barnet, Haringey
|-
! N3
| LONDON
| Finchley district: Finchley, Church End, Finchley Central
| Barnet
|-
! N4
| LONDON
| Finsbury Park district: Finsbury Park, Manor House, Harringay (part), Stroud Green 
| Haringey, Islington, Hackney
|-
! N5
| LONDON
| Highbury district: Highbury, Highbury Fields
| Islington, Hackney
|-
! N6
| LONDON
| Highgate district: Highgate, Hampstead Heath (part)
| Camden, Haringey, Islington
|-
! N7
| LONDON
| Holloway district: Holloway, Barnsbury (part), Finsbury Park (part), Islington (part), Tufnell Park (part)
| Islington, Camden
|-
! N8
| LONDON
| Hornsey district: Hornsey, Crouch End, Harringay (part)
| Haringey, Islington
|-
! N9
| LONDON
| Lower Edmonton district: Lower Edmonton, Edmonton (part)
| Enfield
|-
! N10
| LONDON
| Muswell Hill district: Muswell Hill, Friern Barnet (part)
| Haringey, Barnet
|-
! N11
| LONDON
| New Southgate district: New Southgate, Friern Barnet, Bounds Green, Arnos Grove (part)
| Enfield, Barnet, Haringey
|-
! N12
| LONDON
| North Finchley district: North Finchley, Woodside Park, Friern Barnet (part)
| Barnet
|-
! N13
| LONDON
| Palmers Green district: Palmers Green, Bowes Park (part)
| Enfield
|-
! N14
| LONDON
| Southgate district: Southgate, Oakwood, Arnos Grove (part)
| Enfield, Barnet
|-
! N15
| LONDON
| South Tottenham district: South Tottenham, Harringay (part), West Green, Seven Sisters
| Haringey
|-
! N16
| LONDON
| Stoke Newington district: Stoke Newington, Stamford Hill (part), Shacklewell, Dalston (part), Newington Green (part)
| Islington, Hackney
|-
! N17
| LONDON
| Tottenham district: Tottenham
| Haringey
|-
! N18
| LONDON
| Upper Edmonton district: Upper Edmonton, Edmonton (part)
| Enfield
|-
! N19
| LONDON
| Upper Holloway district: Upper Holloway, Archway, Tufnell Park (part)
| Islington, Camden
|-
! N20
| LONDON
| Whetstone district: Whetstone, Totteridge, Oakleigh Park
| Barnet
|-
! N21
| LONDON
| Winchmore Hill district: Winchmore Hill, Bush Hill (part), Grange Park, World's End (part)
| Enfield
|-
! N22
| LONDON
| Wood Green district: Wood Green, Bowes Park (part)
| Haringey, Enfield
|-
! N81
| LONDON
| Electoral Reform Services
| non-geographic 
|}

Boundaries
Postcode district N1 is the nearest of N postcode districts to central London and the N2–N22 postcode districts to its north. The postcode area is roughly bounded by the River Lea to the east and the Inner Ring Road to the south. In the west, the boundary cuts through Hampstead Heath and follows the North Circular Road and Dollis Brook for short distances. The northern boundary cuts through several open spaces and follows the A110 road for a short distance. The postcode area maps to the London Borough of Haringey, most of the London Borough of Islington, the northwestern section of the London Borough of Hackney, southeastern parts of the London Borough of Barnet, southern sections of the London Borough of Enfield, and small parts of the London Borough of Camden.

Map

See also
Postcode Address File
List of postcode areas in the United Kingdom
London postal district

References

External links
Royal Mail's Postcode Address File
A quick introduction to Royal Mail's Postcode Address File (PAF)

Postcode areas covering London
Media and communications in the London Borough of Hackney
Media and communications in the London Borough of Islington
Media and communications in the London Borough of Haringey
Media and communications in the London Borough of Enfield
Media and communications in the London Borough of Barnet